Group F of the 2010 FIFA World Cup began on 14 June 2010 and ended on 24 June 2010. The group consisted of 2006 winner Italy, Paraguay, New Zealand and Slovakia. Italy and Paraguay previously met in the first round of the 1950 tournament, with Italy winning 2–0; neither qualified for the next round.

Italy were eliminated from the group with just two points, behind underdogs New Zealand, who drew all three of their matches to finish on three points. New Zealand ended up being the only unbeaten team at this World Cup, thanks in part to eventual champions Spain losing to Switzerland in their Group H game. Italy placed last, making it the first time since 1974 that the Italians did not advance beyond the first round.

Standings

Paraguay advanced to play Japan (runner-up of Group E) in the round of 16.
Slovakia advanced to play Netherlands (winner of Group E) in the round of 16.

Matches
All times local (UTC+2)

Italy vs Paraguay

New Zealand vs Slovakia

Slovakia vs Paraguay

Italy vs New Zealand

Slovakia vs Italy

Paraguay vs New Zealand

References

Group F
group
Group
Group
Slovakia at the 2010 FIFA World Cup